The Silver Brumby is an Australian animated children's television series written by Jon Stephens, Judy Malmgren and Paul Williams based on Elyne Mitchell's Silver Brumby books. A total of 39 episodes were produced by Media World Features between 1996 and 1998 and was originally broadcast on Network Ten.

Plot
The series focuses on Thowra, a silver colt, his brothers Storm and Arrow and their friends the bush animals in their continued quest to resist the Men's efforts to capture them.  The series is very loosely based on the books.

Characters

Horses
Thowra (voiced by John Higginson (Season 1) and Brett Climo (Seasons 2 and 3)) - The "Silver Brumby", and Yarraman's youngest son. A calm, kind and brave horse who values his friends. He is often chased by the Man.
Storm (voiced by Doug Tremlett) - Older brother of Thowra. A loyal and kind horse who stands by Thowra's side in the event of trouble. Starting in Season 2, it is presumed that Storm left Thowra's gang to form his own herd, as he is only mentioned and never seen again.
Arrow (voiced by Rhys Muldoon (Season 1) and Stephen Whittaker (Seasons 2 and 3)) - A chestnut brumby and half-brother of Thowra. He is the oldest of Yarraman's three sons. Arrow is an arrogant and jealous horse who seeks an opportunity to prove himself better than Thowra, but often gets himself into trouble. Occasionally he will assist Thowra when trouble affects him too. He gets his name from the arrow-shaped marking on his face. It is presumed that Arrow inherited his mean-spirited nature from his mother. According to Benni, there was 'never a mean-spirited mare like her.
Boon Boon (voiced by Rebecca Gibney) - A pretty filly and the Brolga's daughter, who loves Thowra and is his equal on courage, compassion and wisdom. 
Brolga (voiced by John Stanton) - A very bitter, pompous and bossy stallion who fiercely protects his herd and does not welcome Thowra or his friends. He fought Yarraman, Thowra's father, and slew him, claiming the title "King of the Cascade Brumbies" in the process.
Aranda - A paint-colored horse and the Brolga's favourite mare. She often watches the herd while the Brolga is away.
Yooralla - A young foal who joins Thowra's herd. He became lost from his mother and home herd after a storm. His older sister, Gunda, came to take him home, but he decided to stay with Thowra to continue learning the ways of the wild.
Yarraman - Thowra, Storm and Arrow's father, former "King of the Cascade Brumbies". His mate was Bel Bel. Eventually the Brolga killed and succeeded him.
Golden - A palomino filly, brought to the bush by the Man. She is briefly freed by Thowra, but decides to return home after she is injured by a razorback. She escapes later on after hearing rumors of Thowra's leap to death, then returned to the Man after proving the rumors were false.
Ebony - The black race horse, who visits the High Country to have a race to beat Thowra.
Gunda - A young filly and Yooralla's older sister. She came to the High Country to find her brother after he was lost during a storm. After hearing of his decision to stay, she returns to her home herd in the South.
Narrabri - A young foal in Thowra's herd. He and Yooralla are good friends, and spend time playing together. Unfortunately they have a tendency to get into trouble while playing. Narrabri is quite a level-headed youngster - he realizes that they are in trouble before Yooralla, and remembers old advice/sayings during times of trouble. Narrabri and Yooralla are some of the first to encounter the Bun-Yip at Misty Lake.
Yuri - One of The Brolga's sons. Yuri is a friend of Yooralla's, and sometimes leaves his herd to play with the orphan foal. He doesn't think much of Thowra, having been brought up to think The Silver Brumby is less than his legend. He too gets into trouble while playing with Yooralla.
The Prince of the West - A very narcissistic and foolish stranger from the West, who comes to the High Country in search of a mate to take back with him. While Thowra is away, and Arrow is left in charge of the herd, he sets his sights on Boon Boon - but is unlikely to win The Brolga's approval. He returns home to the West after the Brolga chases him off.
Boomerang - A young foal from Thowra's gang. He is the only one of the three colts in the gang that escape the capture of the Man.
Ilinga - An elderly Brumbie from the South who comes to the High Country in search of Thowra to see if the legends she has heard are true. She wishes to see what Thowra is like and determine if he will make a good King of the Cascade Brumbies.
Bel Bel - Thowra's mother, and former mate of Yarraman. She is seen in the opening credits, and appears to have similar coloring to Thowra and Golden.
Rocky and Woomera - Two colts from Thowra's herd who foolishly follow Arrow when fleeing from a brumby hunt. As a result, they are captured, and become too used to the food given to them by The Man to want to return to the wild.
Anda - One of the Brolga's daughters. Anda and Moolie caused Aranda to fall over a cliff one day when running away after a snake scare. They go to fetch help to free Aranda.
Moolie - One of The Brolga's sons. He doeasn't have much luck with snakes, often finding himself a target of them. He and Anda almost cause Aranda terrible trouble while bolting from a snake.
Echo - The Man's black horse. Echo has chased Thowra all over the High Country. It is clear that he respects Thowra in the way he speaks of him. He is loyal to The Man, and is renowned as the strongest, fastest stock horse in the district.
Snowy - Charlie's white horse.

Other animals
Currawong (voiced by Michael Carman) - A sycophantic pied currawong, and Brolga's spy who often suffers mistreatment from Brolga or other trouble
Wombat (voiced by Michael Carman) - A grumpy, griping wombat who goes on a path without looking ahead and blaming both humans and animals for making his progress difficult. His weakness into helping others is flattery and pestering. He has a wife and two children.
Mrs. Dingo (voiced by Marg Downey) - A dingo who is a mother of two pups - Bindi and Warri. She is wary of any danger that comes in the bush and has a lot of respect for Thowra.
Benni (voiced by Bud Tingwell) - A fatherly grey kangaroo and a close friend of Thowra's. He has a wife named Silky, and an unnamed daughter. He also narrates the series.
Mopoke (voiced by Michael Carman) - A wise boobook owl who gives advice to Thowra and his friends but talks in poetic rhyming couplets.
Eee and Mu (voiced by Richard Aspel and Marg Downey respectively) - A couple of loudmouth emus who gossip and mostly talk to each other.
Skink - A small green skink who never speaks or makes noise. He is very accident prone.
Eagle - A wedge-tailed eagle who is occasionally seen as a background character throughout the series. He only spoke briefly in the episode 'Seeking A Legend' to Ilinga, and during the latter part of the series, hunts after Currawong.
Silky - (voiced by Marg Downey) - A female grey Kangaroo, and Benni's wife.
Warri and Bindi - Mrs. Dingo's two young pups. The two of them have noses for trouble, but are eager to play with Thowra and the members of his herd. They slowly begin to learn the ways of the High Country to avoid capture by the Trappers that come to hunt Dingos.
Whip Bird - She is to Thowra what Currawong is to Brolga. The small green bird comes to tell Thowra what she has heard if it is something of consequence. She is a good-natured creature, though she seems to enjoy baiting Arrow in the same way as Mopoke. She finishes her every sentence with a spirited "WHIP!"
Kookaburra (voiced by Marg Downey) - TBA
Gang Gangs - These noisy birds from the first few inches of the bush grapevine. Their loud, repetitive cries are usually nothing but gossip. Though ignore it at your peril: sometimes they are the very very first to report when danger has arrived in the High Country. At the first sign of danger they fly up into the air crying "DANGER! DANGER! BEWARE! BEWARE! WARNING! WARNING!"
Benni and Silky's daughter - A young joey who spends a lot of time sitting in Silkie's pouch. She is caught in a dingo trap and injured. The Old Prospector helps her to recover. During her time healing she becomes too used to his ways and is at first reluctant to leave him.
Mrs. Wombat - The wife of Wombat.
Baby Wombats - The two children of Mr. Wombat and Mrs. Wombat.
Razorback - A vicious Razorback who came to the low country and begun to attack the local animals. He seriously injured Golden's neck but was soon chased into the sea by Mopoke and the Gang Gangs, his fate afterwards is unknown.
 Lion - An African lion from a circus who was lost because the transport crashed in a storm, and was force to hunt the local fauna until Thowra tricked him into a pit trap. Thanks to Thowra and the old prospector, the lion returned back to the circus. He seemed fierce but turned out to be very soft due to his upbringing in captivity. 
 Spider - A house spider who grumbles because some of the brumbies keep messing his webs up.
 Bunyip - A bunyip who dwells on Misty Lake. He looked fierce, but proved to be a dopey, gentle prankster.

Humans
The Man (voiced by Richard Aspel) - An unnamed human who spends much of the year in his hut in the High Country. He frequently tries to catch brumbies - particularly Thowra. He rides his own personal black horse named Echo. Despite his urge to catch Thowra, he also comes to respect the Silver Brumby for his elusiveness. He gains a new appreciation for Thowra and Boon-Boon after they free him from an avalanche.
The Prospector (voiced by Edward Hepple) - A benevolent and wise man who has lived in the bush for a very long time. He pans for gold in the river and aids the animals as often as he can spare.
Charlie - Don's son, and the Old Prospector's grandson - a kind, plucky boy who loves the bush and animals as much as his grandfather. His personal horse is a white, gray-maned stallion named Snowy.
The Trappers - A pair of inept men who come to the High Country to trap and shoot animals, particularly Dingos. They end up catching Currawong and Mopoke at some point, but are chased away from their camp afterwards. The Man sets Mopoke and Currawong free. After some time of being lost in the High Country, the Trappers leave, presumably to go hunt animals elsewhere. They briefly returned to recapture the circus lion.
Don - Charlie's father and the Old Prospector's son-in-law. Don is a stockman who comes to the High Country to hunt brumbies. He seems very single-minded when it comes to money, and is unable to see Charlie's unhappiness with the way he makes his living. Don and the Old Prospector don't get on very well as they clash over Don's choice to hunt brumbies.
Charlie's mother - Charlie's mother, Don's wife and the Prospector's daughter.  Never appears, and is only mentioned in one episode.
Bob - A friend of the Man, and fellow stockman. He is sometimes involved in brumby hunts in the High Country and uses Dead Horse Hut as a base.
Anne - A feisty, gentle, and sensible girl who goes skiing on the High Country trails during winter. Along with Tom, she sees Thowra in the snow, and has heard his legends. When Tom is hurt, she follows Thowra and Boon Boon to Dead Horse Hut where she is able to lead the Man back to where Tom is waiting.
Tom - A youngster who goes skiing in the High Country in winter. He sees Thowra while skiing and decides it would be great if he and Anne managed to catch him. Unfortunately he is injured trying to approach Thowra when he falls down a cliff. He is saved by Thowra and Boon Boon when they lead Anne to find the Man.

Animation
This is one of the earliest animated TV shows to use digital ink-and-paint for animating as opposed to the traditional usage of cels (which were still being used by other animation production companies at the time).

Episodes

Season 1 (1996–97)

Season 2 (1997)

Season 3 (1998)

Home media
The Complete Series 1 DVD was released in 2006, and Volume 1-6 on VHS in 1997 (Australia only) on Roadshow Entertainment.
The Animated Adventures of The Silver Brumby is not available to buy on DVD in full. As of 29 April 2011 only the first series has been released in its entirety, with a bonus episode from series two, on Region 4 DVD format. Nine episodes have to date been released on Region 2 format.

References

External links

 

Australian children's animated adventure television series
1990s Australian animated television series
1996 Australian television series debuts
1998 Australian television series endings
English-language television shows
Television shows based on Australian novels
Animated television series about horses
Network 10 original programming
Fictional horses
Television shows set in Victoria (Australia)
APRA Award winners